Malpas railway station was a railway station that served the historic market town of Malpas, Cheshire on the Whitchurch and Tattenhall Railway or Chester-Whitchurch Branch Line.  The station itself was located at Hampton Heath and was also known locally as Hampton Station.

History
On the eve of an official visit to Chester in May 1917 during the First World War, the Royal Train carrying George V and Queen Mary stopped for the night at Malpas station. Troops from the Household Division guarded the area throughout the stay.

In 1944, wounded German POWs captured in Normandy during Operation Overload were brought to Malpas before being transferred to the US Army hospital established just across the border in Penley, Wales.

The track bed has been almost built on by industrial units but is still traceable. The station building has been restored. The buildings are now used as offices.

Services

References

Further reading

External links
 Malpas station on Subterranea Britannica

Disused railway stations in Cheshire
Former London and North Western Railway stations
Railway stations in Great Britain opened in 1872
Railway stations in Great Britain closed in 1957
1872 establishments in England
1957 disestablishments in England